Juan Armando Ruiz Hernández is a lawyer from Mexico City, who represented Mexico in the 2010 Paralympics, under the Alpine skiing discipline and represented Mexico in the 2006 Paralympics. He was the lone Mexican competitor in the 2006 Torino paralympic games, however Arly Velásquez joined him in representing Mexico in 2010.

References

See also
Mexico at the 2006 Winter Paralympics
Mexico at the 2010 Winter Paralympics
2010 Winter Paralympics national flag bearers

Paralympic alpine skiers of Mexico
Living people
Mexican male alpine skiers
Year of birth missing (living people)